Left-right determination factor 1 is a protein that in humans is encoded by the LEFTY1 gene.

Function

This gene encodes a member of the TGF-beta family of proteins. A similar secreted protein in mouse plays a role in left-right asymmetry determination of organ systems during development. Alternative processing of this protein can yield three different products. This gene is closely linked to both a related family member and a related pseudogene.

See also
 Lefty
 Lefty-1

References

Further reading